The Leslie River is a river of the northwest of New Zealand's South Island located in the Buller District. The river's entire length is within Kahurangi National Park.

See also
List of rivers of New Zealand

References

Rivers of the West Coast, New Zealand
Rivers of New Zealand